Faktiskt is the eight studio album by Swedish singer-songwriter Orup, released on 15 November 2006, by Roxy Recordings.

Track listing

Personnel 

Orup — vocals, guitar, keyboards, programming, composer, song lyricist, producer
Anders Hansson — drums, percussion, keyboard, programming, producer
Petter Gunnarsson — bass
Staffan Astner — guitar
Per Adebratt — keyboard, programming, producer

Charts

References

External links 

 

2006 albums
Orup albums
Roxy Recordings albums